Constantine, Mawnan and Budock was an electoral division of Cornwall in the United Kingdom which returned one member to sit on Cornwall Council between 2013 and 2021. It was abolished at the 2021 local elections, being succeeded by Constantine, Mabe and Mawnan and Falmouth Trescobeas and Budock.

Councillors

Extent
Constantine, Mawnan and Budock represented the villages of Seworgan, Brill, Constantine, Porth Navas, Helford Passage, Mawnan Smith, Budock Water, Treverva and Lamanva, and the hamlets of Brillwater, Durgan and Mawnan. The division covered 4,750 hectares in total.

Election results

2017 election

2015 by-election

2013 election

References

Electoral divisions of Cornwall Council